Sean Martin Fitzgerald (born 21 August 1962) is a former English List A cricketer. Fitzgerald was a right-handed batsman who primarily played as a wicketkeeper. A technically brilliant batter and wicket keeper, he would also prove to be a very able off spinner in the latter stages of his club career. He was also king of the sesh in his Washy days, mixing with some of the best MC’s

Fitzgerald made his debut for Dorset in the 1989 Minor Counties Championship against Berkshire. From 1989 to 1992 Fitzgerald represented Dorset in 18 Minor Counties matches, with his final match coming against Wales Minor Counties.

Fitzgerald also played a single List A cricket match for Dorset in the first round of the 1990 NatWest Trophy against Glamorgan. He scored two runs and made two stumpings in the match.

Fitzgerald still plays in the Dorset Premier League for Dorchester CC, where he is also the head coach. He is also a coach of the Wessex Cricket School, although that has dropped in standard since his youngest son left after captaining their side for his last year. Fitzgerald is now an established member of the Dorset over 50 sides and contributed a magnificent 110no against Surrey on Thursday, 20 September 2012.

External links
Sean Fitzgerald at Cricinfo
Shawn Fitzgerald at CricketArchive

1962 births
Living people
People from Bridport
Cricketers from Dorset
English cricketers
Dorset cricketers
Wicket-keepers